The Institute of Musical Instrument Technology is the main professional body for all musical instrument makers, tuners and repairers. It was inaugurated on 24 February 1938 and was incorporated on 13 March 1961. According to its website, the institute is the only professional qualification covering the whole field of musical instrument technology.

Sydney A Hurren was the founder of the institute. Other distinguished members, past and present, include Sir James Jeans, Henry Willis III and Henry Willis IV, Sir James Blades, David Grover (Bentley Pianos), Matthias Stöckle (Renner), Herbert Norman, John Norman, Alexander Kerstan (Steingraeber u. Söhne Pianos) and Dr. William McVicker (Royal Festival Hall).

Corporate members of the institute use the letters F.I.M.I.T. (Fellow of the Institute of Musical Instrument Technology), and M.I.M.I.T. (Member of the Institute of Musical Instrument Technology). Honorary life members and honorary life fellows are also corporate members. Associates use the initials A.I.M.I.T. (Associate of the Institute of Musical Instrument Technology) but are non-corporate members.

Honorary fellows, students, companions, and graduates are not Corporate members.

The institute publishes a Newsletter and an annual Directory, both of which are available exclusively to its membership.

The current secretary is Malcolm Dalton FIMIT; the president and treasurer is Malcolm Smith FIMIT.

Instrument makers, repairers and tuners who are skilled and have been professionally trained are eligible to join the IMIT.
For further information visit the IMIT website: www.imit.org.uk

External links
Institute of Musical Instrument Technology

Musical Instrument Technology